A drop kick is a type of kick in various codes of football. It involves a player dropping the ball and then kicking it as it touches the ground.

Drop kicks are used as a method of restarting play and scoring points in rugby union and rugby league. Also, association football goalkeepers often return the ball to play with drop kicks. The kick was once in wide use in both Australian rules football and gridiron football, but is rarely used anymore by either sport.

Rugby

Drop kick technique 

The drop kick technique in rugby codes is usually to hold the ball with one end pointing downwards in two hands above the kicking leg. The ball is dropped onto the ground in front of the kicking foot, which makes contact at the moment or fractionally after the ball touches the ground, called the half-volley. The kicking foot usually makes contact with the ball slightly on the instep.

In a rugby union kick-off, or drop out, the kicker usually aims to kick the ball high but not a great distance, and so usually strikes the ball after it has started to bounce off the ground, so the contact is made close to the bottom of the ball.

Rugby league 
In rugby league, drop kicks are mandatory to restart play from the goal line (called a goal line drop-out) after the defending team is tackled or knocks on in the in-goal area or the defending team causes the ball to go dead or into touch-in-goal. Drop kicks are also mandatory to restart play from the 20 metre line after an unsuccessful penalty goal attempt goes dead or into touch-in-goal and to score a drop goal (sometimes known as a field goal) in open play, which is worth one point.

Drop kicks are optional for a penalty kick to score a penalty goal (this being done rarely, as place kicks are generally used) and when kicking for touch (the sideline) from a penalty, although the option of a punt kick is usually taken instead.

Rugby union 

In rugby union, a drop kick is used for the kick-off and restarts and to score a drop goal (sometimes called a field goal). Originally, it was one of only two ways to score points, along with the place kick.

Drop kicks are mandatory from the centre spot to start a half (a kick-off), from the centre spot to restart the game after points have been scored, to restart play from the 22-metre line (called a drop-out) after the ball is touched down or made dead in the in-goal area by the defending team when the attacking team kicked or took the ball into the in-goal area, and to score a drop goal (sometimes called a field goal) in open play, which is worth three points.

Drop kicks are optional for a conversion kick after a try has been scored.

Rugby sevens 
The usage of drop kicks in rugby sevens is the same as in rugby union, except that drop kicks are used for all conversion attempts and for penalty kicks, both of which must be taken within 40 seconds of the try being scored or the award of the penalty.

American and Canadian (gridiron) football 
In both American and Canadian football, one method of scoring a field goal, fair-catch kick (American Football only), or extra point is by drop-kicking the football through the goal, although the technique is very rarely used in modern play.

It contrasts with the punt, wherein the player kicks the ball without letting it hit the ground first, and the place kick, wherein the player kicks a stationary ball off the ground: "from placement". A drop kick is significantly more difficult; as Jim Thorpe once explained, "I regard the place kick as almost two to one safer than the drop kick in attempting a goal from the field."

The drop kick was often used in early football as a surprise tactic. The ball would be snapped or lateraled to a back, who would fake a run or pass, but then would kick the field goal instead. This method of scoring worked well in the 1920s and early 1930s, when the football was rounder at the ends (similar to a modern rugby ball). Early football stars such as Charles Brickley, Frank Hudson, Jim Thorpe, Paddy Driscoll, and Al Bloodgood were skilled drop-kickers; Driscoll in 1925 and Bloodgood in 1926 hold a tied NFL record of four drop kicked field goals in a single game. Driscoll's 55-yard drop kick in 1924 stood as the unofficial record for field goal range until Bert Rechichar kicked a 56-yard field goal (by placekick) in 1953.

In 1934, the ball was made more pointed at the ends. The creation of the pointed football is generally credited to Shorty Ray, at the time a college football official and later the NFL's head of officiating. This made passing the ball easier, as was its intent, but made the drop kick obsolete, as the more pointed ball did not bounce up from the ground reliably. The drop kick was supplanted by the place kick, which cannot be attempted out of a formation generally used as a running or passing set. The drop kick remains in the rules, but is seldom seen, and as explained below, is rarely effective when attempted.

In Canadian football the drop kick can be taken from any point on the field, unlike placekicks which must be attempted behind the line of scrimmage.

NFL 
Before the NFL–AFL merger, the last successful drop kick in the NFL was executed by Scooter McLean of the Chicago Bears in their 37–9 victory over the New York Giants on December 21, 1941, in the NFL Championship game at Chicago's Wrigley Field. Though it was not part of the NFL at the time, the All-America Football Conference saw its last drop kick November 28, 1948, when Joe Vetrano of the San Francisco 49ers drop kicked an extra point after a muffed snap against the Cleveland Browns.

To date, the only successful drop kick in the NFL since 1941 was by Doug Flutie, the backup quarterback of the New England Patriots, against the Miami Dolphins on January 1, 2006, for an extra point after a touchdown. Flutie had estimated "an 80 percent chance" of making the drop kick, which was called to give Flutie, 43 at the time, the opportunity to make a historic kick in his final NFL game; the drop kick was his last play in the NFL.

Dallas Cowboys punter Mat McBriar attempted a maneuver similar to a drop kick during the 2010 Thanksgiving Day game after a botched punt attempt, but the ball bounced several times before the kick and the sequence of events is officially recorded as a fumble, followed by an illegal kick, with the fumble being recovered by the New Orleans Saints 29 yards downfield from the spot of the kick. The Saints declined the illegal kick penalty.

New England Patriots kicker Stephen Gostkowski attempted an onside drop kick on a free kick after a safety against the Pittsburgh Steelers on October 30, 2011. The kick went out of bounds.

New Orleans Saints quarterback Drew Brees, a former teammate of Flutie's, executed a drop kick late on an extra point attempt in the fourth quarter of the 2012 Pro Bowl; the kick fell short.
On December 20, 2015, Buffalo Bills punter Colton Schmidt executed what is believed to be an unintentional drop kick after a botched punt against the Washington Redskins; because the Redskins recovered the kick, it was treated as a punt (and not as a field goal attempt, which would have pushed the ball back to the spot of the kick).

Seattle Seahawks punter Michael Dickson drop kicked a kickoff from the 50-yard-line on September 17, 2018, against the Chicago Bears. The kick landed inside the 5-yard-line and was returned to a spot less far out than a touchback would have been automatically returned to, making it a successful strategy. Dickson made an onside drop kick attempt at the end of the same game, which was unsuccessful (recovered by the Bears). Seahawks coach Pete Carroll noted that he considered Dickson the team's backup kicker and would kick field goals and extra point attempts with the drop kick should there be an injury to placekicker Sebastian Janikowski. Following an injury to Janikowski, Dickson attempted several drop kickoffs on January 5, 2019, against the Dallas Cowboys, including an onside kick which was received normally as a fair catch.

The drop kick came under controversy in 2019, after Justin Tucker of the Baltimore Ravens used the maneuver on a kickoff late in a game against the Kansas City Chiefs. The drop kick was intended to force the Chiefs to fair catch the ball, preventing them from running out the clock. As 2:01 was showing on the game clock and a fair-caught kickoff does not run any time off the clock, it would force the Chiefs to run a play before the two-minute warning. Several weeks after the kick, league offices claimed the maneuver was illegal. Ravens head coach John Harbaugh disputed this, noting that they had cleared it with the NFL before using the drop kick and were not penalized by the in-game officials. The NFL's statement claimed that the ball was not kicked immediately after the bounce. Tucker made his approach and dropped the ball to the ground. He did not like the bounce and picked the ball up, retreating back for a second approach and dropped the ball a second time before kicking it. The NFL's statement suggested a false start should have been called on Tucker for not kicking the ball on the first drop. An article on CBS Sports stated that the NFL had made a midseason rule change banning the drop kick, but no statement from the NFL has ever confirmed this. It was later clarified that Tucker's drop kick action was illegal because he did not kick the ball "immediately" after the ball touched the ground. Rather, Tucker threw the ball upwards, allowed it to drop to the ground, then kicked the ball as it was falling from its apex after bouncing.

San Francisco 49ers' kicker Robbie Gould attempted an onside drop kick against the Philadelphia Eagles on October 4, 2020. The recovery was unsuccessful. The Chicago Bears also attempted an unsuccessful onside drop kick against the Tennessee Titans on November 8, 2020.

NCAA 
The last successful drop kick extra point in the NCAA was by Jason Millgan of Hartwick College on December 11, 1998, St. Lawrence University. Frosty Peters of Montana State College made 17 drop kicks in one game in 1924.

On October 24, 2020, Iowa State University backup punter Corey Dunn attempted a surprise on-side drop kick off against Oklahoma State University. It was nearly successful as the Cowboys failed to cleanly field the kick, but Oklahoma State recovered the ball in the ensuing scrum.

Canadian football 

In the Canadian game, the drop kick can be attempted at any time by either team. Any player on the kicking team behind the kicker, and including the kicker, can recover the kick. When a drop kick goes out of bounds, possession on the next scrimmage goes to the non-kicking team.

On September 8, 1974, Tom Wilkinson, quarterback for the Edmonton Eskimos, unsuccessfully attempted a drop kick field goal in the final seconds of a 24–2 romp over the Winnipeg Blue Bombers.

During one game in the 1980s, Hamilton Tiger-Cats wide receiver Earl Winfield was unable to field a punt properly; in frustration, he kicked the ball out of bounds. The kick was considered a drop kick and led to a change of possession, with the punting team regaining possession of the ball.

Arena football 
In the former AFL (North American Arena Football League), a drop-kicked extra point was worth two points, rather than one point, while a drop-kicked field goal counted for four points rather than three. The most recent conversion of a drop kick was by Geoff Boyer of the Pittsburgh Power on June 16, 2012; it was the first successful conversion in the AFL since 1997. In 2018, Maine Mammoths kicker Henry Nell converted a drop kick as a PAT against the Massachusetts Pirates in the National Arena League.

Australian rules football 
Once the preferred method of conveying the ball over long distances, the drop kick has been superseded by the drop punt as a more accurate means of delivering the ball to a fellow player. Drop kicks were last regularly used in the 1970s, and by that time mostly for kicking in after a behind and very rarely in general play. AFL historian and statistician Col Hutchison believes that Sam Newman was the last player to kick a set-shot goal with a drop kick, in 1980, although goals in general play from a drop kick do occur on rare occasions, including subsequent goals by players such as Alastair Lynch and Darren Bewick. Hutchison says drop kicks were phased out of the game by Norm Smith in defence due to their risky nature; Ron Barassi, a player Smith coached, took this onboard for his own coaching career, banning it for all but Barry Cable, who, according to Hutchison, was a "magnificent disposer of the ball".

See also 
 Drop goal
 Grubber kick
 Bomb kick
 Glossary of American football
 Dropped-ball

References

Further reading 

American football plays
Australian rules football terminology
Rugby league terminology
Rugby union terminology

fr:Drop (rugby à XV)